Newnham Bridge railway station was a station on the Tenbury and Bewdley Railway in Newnham Bridge, Worcestershire, England. The station was named 'Newnham' when it opened on 13 August 1864, being renamed 'Newnham Bridge' in May 1873. It closed on 1 August 1962.

Unusually, the main station building was at rail level. From there, passengers used a foot crossing over the passing loop and running line to reach the single platform. The station survives, it was a garden centre for many years but the up yard was turned into a housing estate.

References

Further reading

Disused railway stations in Worcestershire
Railway stations in Great Britain opened in 1864
Railway stations in Great Britain closed in 1962
Former Great Western Railway stations